NGC 959 is a spiral galaxy in the northern constellation of Triangulum. It was discovered on November 9, 1876, by French astronomer Édouard Stephan. This galaxy is located at a distance of 36 million light years and is receding with a heliocentric radial velocity of 596 km/s. It is a member of the NGC 1023 Group of galaxies.

The morphological class of this galaxy is Sdm:, indicating it is a spiral (S) with disorganized, irregular arms and no central bulge (dm). The ':' suffix indicates some uncertainty about the classification. It has a visual magnitude of 12.4. The galactic plane is inclined at an angle of 50° to the line of sight from the Earth, giving it an elliptical profile with the major axis aligned along a position angle of 65°. The size of the D25 ellipse (where the brightness of the galaxy drops to magnitude 25) is  arcminutes.

When images of NGC 959 are corrected for the effects of extinction from dust, a central bar feature can be discerned. The galaxy then shows a non-negligible bulge or central condensation, and may instead have a morphological type of SBcd. It displays a cuspy central density profile and bulge-like monotonic decrease in ellipticity toward the core.

References

External links

Triangulum (constellation)
Spiral galaxies
0613
005849